Chris Sobkowicz is a Canadian wheelchair curler from Manitoba.

At the international level, he is a  curler.

At the national level, he is a 2011 Canadian wheelchair champion curler.

Teams

References

External links 

Living people
Canadian male curlers
Curlers from Manitoba
Canadian wheelchair curlers
World wheelchair curling champions
Canadian wheelchair curling champions
Year of birth missing (living people)
Place of birth missing (living people)